Relations between Cyprus and the United States can be described as excellent, both sharing membership in the United Nations, International Monetary Fund, the Organization for Security and Co-operation in Europe, the World Bank and the World Trade Organization. Cyprus has been an observer to the Organization of American States.

Bilateral & Strategic Relationships

Relations between the United States and Cyprus can be described as being excellent, yet historically complicated due to many factors. Cyprus is seen as democratic state that can serve as a forward base for the United States. In numerous occasions military bases, ports and airports such as the Port of Limassol and the Larnaca International Airport respectively, have been used for humanitarian and support purposes by the US. Cyprus has also given exclusive rights to a US oil extracting multinationals such as ExxonMobil to extract natural gas from its Exclusive Economic Zone. U.S. imports from Cyprus agricultural products and minerals while business ties encompass several services.

The US also works closely with Cyprus in order to advance shared priorities both bilaterally and in the context of strategic partnership with the European Union, which Cyprus is a member state. The Bilateral partnership focuses in areas of common interest, such as peace, security, trade and investment, diversifying European energy sources, and protecting cultural heritage across the island. The Cabinet of Israel approach of Cyprus over the recent years, and especially after the Gaza flotilla raid, has boosted Cyprus–Israel relations even further. The United States supports this approach with an Energy Triangle between Cyprus, Israel and Greece. 

In 2018, the United States and the Republic of Cyprus signed a Statement of Intent to also strengthen and develop their security relationship. The agreement encompasses efforts to combat terrorism, enhance maritime security and further promote regional stability in the Eastern Mediterranean. The U.S. Embassy in Cyprus is located in Engomi area, within the capital city of Nicosia. The current U.S. Ambassador to Cyprus is Judith G. Garber. Cyprus maintains an embassy at Washington, D.C. and a consulate general in New York City. The United States Department of State retains detail information about Cyprus and US relations and operations.

Wilbur Ross, the acting United States Secretary of Commerce, was a major shareholder and vice chairman of the board of Bank of Cyprus, after he invested €400 million in the bank in 2014. Prior to his appointment, Ross was a successful banker known for acquiring and restructuring companies and later selling them for a profit once operations have been improved. Ross is a hall of fame member and past director of the Turnaround management Association.

War on Terror
The United States is also working closely with Cyprus in the War on Terrorism. A mutual legal assistance treaty, which has been in force since September 18, 2002, facilitates bilateral cooperation. Cyprus also signed a Proliferation Security Initiative with the United States on July 25, 2005, which reinforces bilateral counter-terrorism cooperation.

Joint Energy Projects
The US respects the rights of Cyprus to develop its resources in its EEZ and has repeated caution to Turkeys destabilizing Oil & Gas research within Cyprus EEZ. The "US remains deeply concerned by Turkey's repeated attempts to conduct drilling operations in the waters off Cyprus... This provocative step raises tensions in the region. We urge Turkish authorities to halt these operations and encourage all parties to act with restraint and refrain from actions that increase tensions in the region" stated Morgan Ortagus of the United States Department of State in 2019. Cyprus has called on Turkey to delineate the sea boundaries between the two countries.

US position on Cyprus Dispute
The United States and The Republic of Cyprus established official diplomatic relations in 1960, right after the British Cyprus's independence from the United Kingdom. Differences immediately arose between the majority Greek Cypriot (77.1%) and minority Turkish Cypriot (18.2%) communities during the implementation of the Constitution of Cyprus provided at the time. Subsequently, inter-communal violence led to the establishment of the United Nations Peacekeeping Force in Cyprus in 1964. In 1974, a Coup d'état backed by the Greek military junta of 1967–1974 failed to provide Enosis (union) with Greece. Subsequently, a Turkish invasion of Cyprus has followed, that resulted in the capture of approximately 40% of the island and a de facto division of its people and land since 1974. Today, the Republic of Cyprus is the only official government of the island state, however, more than 1/3 of the north is administered by Turkish Cypriots, through the “Turkish Republic of Northern Cyprus” proclaimed in 1983. The United States, does not recognize the “TRNC,” nor does any other country in the world except Turkey. About 30,000 Turkish Troops remain on the island while the "Green line" buffer zone is patrolled by UNFICYP. The United States regards the status quo on the Cyprus dispute as "unacceptable" and fully supports the UN-led inter-communal negotiations as the rightful venue to achieve a fair settlement. In December 2019, the US Congress lifted a decades-old arms embargo on Cyprus. On 2 September 2020, United States decided to lift embargo on selling "non-lethal" military goods to Cyprus for one year starting from 1 October. On October 1, 2022, the United States formally lifted the Defense Trade Restrictions, allowing Cyprus to acquire American weapons.

US Bi-communal Support
Since the 1970s, the US has channeled millions in assistance to both communities and sponsors programs to increase cooperation between the two communities. Following the Annan Plan, the U.S. devoted an additional funding to assist the economic development of the Turkish Cypriots, in order to reduce future settlement costs. In 2000, the US Embassy established a Bicommunal Support Program that is focused on professional development, education and leadership. The UNDP's Action for Cooperation and Trust program is also working with Cypriot organizations to help build relationships island-wide. The focus is on multicultural education and youth empowerment, promoting civil engagement, support to environmental protection and the preservation and promotion of Cyprus's cultural heritage. The Cyprus Partnership for Economic Growth (CyPEG) was also designed to promote business interaction and trade between the communities. Thousands of Cypriots have made friends with members of the “other” community as a result of these programs.

US scholarships to Cypriots
Due to the massive flow of Cypriot under-graduate and post graduate students Cyprus-America Scholarship Program (CASP) offers scholarships for Cypriot students wanting to pursue a bachelor's degree in the United States. The CASP competition is open for bachelor's degrees in all fields except Medicine and Dentistry. A Bachelor's Degree in the United States usually takes four years. The scholarship is for a maximum amount of $25,000 each year, for a maximum total of $100,000.

Embassies 
The Embassy of the United States is located in Nicosia, Cyprus.  The Embassy of Cyprus is located in Washington, D.C.

Principal U.S. officials related to Cyprus
 Ambassador--Judith G. Garber
 Deputy Chief of Mission--Jane B. Zimmerman
 Consular Officer--Randy Carlino
 Acting Defense Attaché—LTC Scott Miller
 Economic/Commercial Officer--James Carouso
 Management Officer--Warren Hadley
 Political Officer--Gregory Macris
 Public Affairs Officer--Thomas S. Miller
 USAID--Thomas A. Dailey

See also
 Foreign relations of the United States
 Foreign relations of Cyprus
 Cypriot Americans
 US–EU relations

References

Further reading
 Bahcheli, Tozun, Theodore A. Couloumbis, and Patricia Carley. Greek-Turkish relations and US foreign policy: Cyprus, the Aegean, and regional stability (US Institute of Peace, 1997) online.
 Miller, Olivia. "Cypriot Americans." Gale Encyclopedia of Multicultural America, edited by Thomas Riggs, (3rd ed., vol. 1, Gale, 2014), pp. 607–617. online
 Stearns, Monteagle. Entangled allies: US policy toward Greece, Turkey, and Cyprus (Council on Foreign relations, 1992). online
 Solsten, Eric. Cyprus: A Country Study (U.S. Library of Congress, 1993). online
 Streissguth, Tom. Cyprus: Divided Island. Minneapolis, Minnesota: Lerner Publications, 1998.
 Uslu, Nasuh. The Turkish-American Relationship Between 1947 and 2003: The History of a Distinctive Relationship (Nova, 2006).

External links
History of Cyprus - U.S. relations

 
United States
Bilateral relations of the United States